Carsten Ramelow (born 20 March 1974) is a German former professional footballer who played as either a central defender or a defensive midfielder.

Known for his tough tackling and defensive positioning, he played professionally for Hertha BSC and Bayer Leverkusen, for 17 years. The recipient of nearly 50 caps with Germany, he represented the nation at one World Cup and one European Championship.

Club career
Born in Berlin, Ramelow grew as a player at local Hertha BSC, playing five second division matches in his first two years combined, and five seasons in total: his debut came on 25 April 1992 (aged 18), in a 0–5 home loss against Bayer Uerdingen. In 1992–93, he helped the reserve squad reach the domestic cup final, where they lost to Bayer 04 Leverkusen.

In January 1996, Ramelow moved to the Bundesliga with Bayer Leverkusen, being a major part of the squads that never finished lower than fourth until the 2003–04 season (except for 2002–03, where they would rank only 15th, the last place before the relegation zone); a defensive-minded player, he scored twice in his top flight debut, a 2–0 home win against F.C. Hansa Rostock on 19 March, and contributed with 16 matches (15 complete) in Bayer's 2001–02 UEFA Champions League runner-up run, including the final loss against Real Madrid.

On 3 November 2004, Ramelow was involved in an incident with A.S. Roma's Francesco Totti, during a 1–1 draw at the Stadio Olimpico in Rome in the Champions League: the Italian Totti jumped on a sliding Ramelow, stomping on his shoulder and back, and receiving a yellow card. From 2006 to 2008, he appeared rarely due to injuries, and announced his retirement from football in March, at the age of 34.

International career
Ramelow first appeared for the Germany national team on 10 October 1998, in a 1–0 loss in Turkey for the UEFA Euro 2000 qualifiers. He went on to win 46 caps, and was summoned for the squads at that tournament (not leaving the bench in an eventual group stage exit) and the 2002 FIFA World Cup (appearing five times for the losing finalists, and receiving a red card in the 2–0 group stage win against Cameroon).

Ramelow was poised to be selected by manager Rudi Völler for Euro 2004 in Portugal, but announced his international retirement one week before the squad was picked.

Career statistics

Honours
Bayer Leverkusen
 Bundesliga runner-up: 1996–97, 1998–99, 1999–2000, 2001–02
 UEFA Champions League runner-up: 2001–02
 DFB-Pokal: runner-up: 2001–02

Germany
 FIFA World Cup runner-up: 2002

Individual
 kicker Bundesliga Team of the Season: 1998–99

Musical career
In 2005, Ramelow published one music album, Sing when you're winning. It was not distributed commercially, only being made available to his family and friends.

References

External links
 
 
 
 Carsten Ramelow at Leverkusen who's who

1974 births
Living people
Footballers from Berlin
German footballers
Association football defenders
Association football midfielders
Association football utility players
Bundesliga players
2. Bundesliga players
Hertha BSC II players
Hertha BSC players
Bayer 04 Leverkusen players
Bayer 04 Leverkusen II players
Germany international footballers
Germany youth international footballers
Germany under-21 international footballers
UEFA Euro 2000 players
2002 FIFA World Cup players
West German footballers